Kula Shaker are an English psychedelic rock band. Led by frontman Crispian Mills, the band came to prominence during the Post-Britpop era of the late 1990s. The band enjoyed commercial success in the UK between 1996 and 1999, notching up a number of Top 10 hits on the UK Singles Chart, including "Tattva", "Hey Dude", "Govinda", "Hush", and "Sound of Drums". The band's debut album, K, reached No. 1 on the UK Albums Chart. It was voted number 879 in Colin Larkin's All Time Top 1000 Albums 3rd Edition (2000).

The band are known for their interest in traditional Indian music, culture, and mysticism, with a number of their most famous songs, including "Tattva" and "Govinda", featuring lyrics written in Sanskrit. The name Kula Shaker was itself inspired by king Kulasekhara, an Indian king from the 9th century. In addition, many of the band's songs feature traditional Indian instruments, such as the sitar, tamboura, and tabla, juxtaposed with guitar-heavy, Western rock instrumentation. Despite achieving commercial success, Kula Shaker were unpopular with many critics, with The Observer'''s Simon Price describing them in 2014 as a "joke band".

Kula Shaker disbanded in September 1999 but reformed in 2004 for sessions for the School of Braja compilation album. This led to plans for a full comeback, although the reformation was not widely publicised until the beginning of 2006. The band's third album, Strangefolk, was issued in 2007 and their fourth, Pilgrims Progress, was released in 2010. The band returned with a mostly sold out European tour and new album K 2.0 in 2016 which was well-received both by the media and the fans.

After taking an extended hiatus, the band released their sixth album, 1st Congregational Church of Eternal Love and Free Hugs in June of 2022, which preceded a UK tour.

Band history
Formation (1988–1995)
The origin of Kula Shaker can be traced back to 1988 when Crispian Mills (grandson of Sir John Mills and son of actress Hayley Mills and film director Roy Boulting) met Alonza Bevan at Richmond upon Thames College in South-West London. The two went on to play together in a band named Objects of Desire, formed later that year. The band's initial line-up consisted of Mills on lead guitar, Bevan on bass, Richard Cave on drums (until 1990) later Marcus French (aka Frog) on drums, Leigh Morris on rhythm guitar, and Marcus Maclaine (then Hayley Mills' boyfriend) on lead vocals. In 1991, Paul Winterhart joined the band, replacing French on drums. During this period, Crispian and Alonza were also responsible for running the Mantra Shack, a psychedelic nightclub at the back of Richmond ice rink, and consequently, the Objects of Desire would often perform at the venue.

The Objects of Desire disbanded acrimoniously in early 1993, after which, Mills went on a spiritual pilgrimage, backpacking around India. The trip had a profound effect on the guitarist, fostering a deep interest in Indian culture and Hinduism. Upon returning to the UK he formed a new band named The Kays, with Bevan, Winterhart, and Mills' cousin Saul Dismont (son of the Bermudian politician Russell Dismont) on vocals. The band's debut live performance was at the 1993 Glastonbury Festival. Within a year, Dismont had left the band, only to be replaced by organist Jay Darlington, who had previously been a member of several mod revival bands. After two years of touring and recording, The Kays elected to change their name and musical direction.

In May 1995, Mills suggested that the band take the name Kula Shaker, in honour of one of the twelve Alvars (saints of south India), the ninth-century Indian emperor and holy man, King Kulashekhara. In Indian culture, the name Kulashekhara is thought to be lucky or auspicious, and this appealed to the struggling band. Mills also posited that Kula Shaker's music should follow a more spiritual and mystical direction in future, in line with his own growing interest in the philosophy of Gaudiya Vaishnavism. This new emphasis on Indian mysticism and instrumentation, dovetailed with the Beatlesque, 1960s derived influences already present in the band's music, to create a sound heavily indebted to 1960s psychedelia.

Mainstream success (1995–1999)
In September 1995 Kula Shaker were joint winners of the in the City contest (along with Placebo), which quickly resulted in a record contract with Columbia Records, who were eager to sign another band that had the multi-platinum, crossover appeal of Oasis. A debut single, "Tattva (Lucky 13 Mix)" (later re-recorded for their debut album) was released on CD and limited 7" vinyl in January 1996, but it entered just outside the UK Top 75, at number 86. "Tattva" was followed quickly in April by the band's second single, "Grateful When You're Dead", a slice of Jimi Hendrix-esque rock which was to become their debut UK Top 40 single (entering at No. 35). Music press and public alike finally began to take notice of the band, and this sudden exposure propelled the re-released (and re-recorded) "Tattva" to No. 4 in the UK Singles Chart. The band's upward climb continued with their third single "Hey Dude", a more traditional rock song which was only kept off the top spot by the Spice Girls when it was released in August.

September saw the release of the band's debut album K, which became the fastest selling debut album in Britain since Elastica's debut the previous year. It was eventually certified 2×Platinum by the BPI in January 1997. The album went on to sell over 850,000 copies in the UK (double platinum), and a further 250,000 copies in the United States.

The fourth and final single from K was "Govinda", which reached No. 7 in the UK charts in December of that year. "Govinda" was sung totally in Sanskrit, and mixed swirling guitars with traditional Indian music. Total sales for all the singles from K came to half a million.

1997 got off to a fine start for the band with four nominations for BRIT Awards, and they subsequently took home the award for "British Breakthrough Act" at the ceremony in February. In the same month they released what would turn out to be their biggest hit, a cover of "Hush" (originally written by Joe South for Billy Joe Royal, and most famously performed by the British hard-rock band Deep Purple), which peaked at number 2. The song also proved successful in the U.S., where it was used on the soundtrack to the blockbuster movie I Know What You Did Last Summer and again in the trailer for the 2014 film Kingsman: The Secret Service. The song was also placed at No. 224 by Virgin Radio, in a poll for the 20th century's greatest songs. In the wake of the single's release, some ill-advised remarks on the traditional mystical properties of Swastikas by Crispian Mills put the band in the firing line of some of the UK press.

Despite the negative publicity, the band pressed on regardless with a set of live shows in the summer of that year, including T in the Park, Glastonbury and the V Festival. The focus during the latter part of 1997 moved to the US where both "Tattva" and "Hey Dude" received airplay exposure. "Tattva" became a minor No. 10 hit in the Modern Rock Tracks chart and "Hey Dude" peaked at No. 25. K itself peaked at No. 11 in the Heatseekers chart and crept to No. 200 in the Billboard charts. An EP, Summer Sun, was released in the U.S. for the band's fans there. The six tracks on the EP were all B-sides to earlier UK singles.

After initial disagreements with management, Kula Shaker resurfaced with the UK-only single "Sound of Drums" in April 1998, peaking at number 3. A promised album in the summer of that year failed to materialise, and the momentum generated by the single was lost as a result. Fans would have to wait until February 1999 to hear any more new material from the forthcoming second album.

The second album Peasants, Pigs & Astronauts was partly recorded aboard the houseboat-studio Astoria, which belongs to guitarist David Gilmour (of Pink Floyd). Brett Findlay joined the band as resident percussionist and remained with the band until their break-up at the end of 1999. The release of Peasants, Pigs & Astronauts was preceded by the single "Mystical Machine Gun" which failed to make as strong an impact on the charts as their previous singles, peaking at Number 14 and only remaining two weeks in the top 40. The album itself followed in March 1999 to mixed reviews, and only sold a mere 25,000 copies in its first week as it crawled in at Number 9 on the album chart, spending only 10 weeks in the UK Top 75. The album went Gold in the UK (over 100,000 copies sold). The third and final single from the album, "Shower Your Love" failed to reignite momentum, stalling at No. 14, even with it having more TV exposure on Top of the Pops, TFI Friday, Later... with Jools Holland and CD:UK.

In June they played Glastonbury Festival and headlined the Lizard Festival in Cornwall in August 1999 to coincide with the total eclipse. The band made a few more festival appearances, including an appearance at V99, as a last-minute replacement for Placebo, before playing their last gig in the Netherlands at the end of August.

In September of that year, the band announced their split. "I have loved my time with Kula Shaker and have experienced more than I could ever have imagined", Mills commented. "We've had an excellent time and been a very tight band, but there comes a time when you want to do your own thing."

Comments on the swastika
Prior to the release of their second album, the band became the subject of controversy surrounding remarks that Mills had made in the NME and Melody Maker, regarding the swastika, calling it a "brilliant image" albeit in the context of its traditional Indian origins.  The Independent on Sunday ran a front page article in April 1997 reprinting Mills' comments and alleging that the guitarist "had dabbled with Nazism". The negative publicity surrounding the incident, along with overexposure in the British media, hurt the band's sales. The Independent article also revealed that the Objects of Desire had used the motto "England will rise again", and had performed at a 1993 conference at Wembley called "Global Deception" at which speakers included renowned conspiracy theorists Eustace Mullins and William Cooper.

Mills responded to the allegations by fax and his responses were incorporated in the article. Mills admitted having played at "Global Deception", but claimed not to have fully understood the nature of the event. He indicated that he now felt that the swastika, which has origins outside Nazism and different meanings in different parts of the world, was hopelessly connected to Nazism in the West. He indicated that it was the outrage that his comments had sparked that had led him to this conclusion. He also offered an unequivocal condemnation of far-right-wing ideology.

Looking back in 2016, Mills said "We thought we were smarter than we were ... that was the innocence of our youth ploughing into the adult world."

Mills' lyrics include themes of unity in diversity ("Tattva"), spiritual devotion ("Govinda") and global peace ("Great Hosanna").

After the split (1999–2004)
Mills went into the studio in 2000 to work on a solo album. Later that year, he toured with a group of musicians under the name Pi, first supporting Robbie Williams on his UK Arena dates, then for some smaller headline shows. A new album was scheduled for release in spring 2001 according to Mills' official website and the NME. However his UK record label didn't feel the material proposed for release was commercial enough, and so Mills negotiated an exit from his contract with them in 2001, continuing to record for the rest of 2001 without a UK record deal.  He played at the Glastonbury Festival in 2001 with Suns of Arqa. At the start of 2002, he began working with Andy Nixon and Dan Mckinna, formerly of Straw, and the trio formed a group, The Jeevas. Mills ditched all his previously recorded material up to that point, though some tracks would later feature as Jeevas B-Sides. They released two albums, toured throughout 2002 and 2003, with some dates in mid-2004. Their records were released on their own Cowboy Music label in the UK and mainland Europe, and by Sony in Japan. Some tentative work was done for their third album, but when it became apparent during 2005 that the reformation of Kula Shaker would be permanent, the band officially split up.

Bevan joined Johnny Marr and the Healers in 2000. As a side project, he formed the band Shep (which included Winterhart on drums). The band played a handful of gigs in 2001–2002 and released some excerpts of recorded music via the web but nothing further was heard of them after 2003. Winterhart joined the band Thirteen:13, who split in 2001. He also drummed on an album by Aqualung as well as being part of Shep. Darlington joined Oasis in 2002 as a touring keyboardist (though not an official band member), and remained in that role until the band's split in 2009.

In December 2002, Sony released a best of album, entitled Kollected – The Best of Kula Shaker. Mills compiled the track listing for the release and approved the sleevenotes. The compilation included the band's final recorded track, a cover of Bob Dylan's "Ballad of a Thin Man", which was later featured on the soundtrack to the 2005 movie Stoned, starring Leo Gregory.

Reformation and Strangefolk (2004–2008)

Kula Shaker's reformation has its origins in sessions for a charity album made with the New Braj Village School (a private school in Badger, California, for young people which includes as part of the curriculum teachings about Krishna and devotional music). The album School of Braja was recorded in 2004 and finally saw release in late 2006. Mills, who masterminded the album, arranged not only that the Jeevas play on two tracks, but he also got in touch with his old bandmate, Alonza Bevan. The two worked on a song together for the album, "Braj Mandala", to which Paul Winterhart added drums. Jay Darlington was asked to be part of the sessions, but declined the opportunity. At the time of the recording, this was announced on the official Jeevas website as Kula Shaker having reformed to contribute a song to the album and was referred to by Mills as a Kula Shaker reunion in subsequent interviews. Additionally, the School of Braja album credits officially state that Kula Shaker appear on the track "Braj Mandala". The sessions for the track went so well that Mills and Bevan began writing together again and making plans for a full-on Kula Shaker comeback that would encompass live touring and the further release of new material. A new band website was also commissioned.

Their first gig back together (as a 3-piece) took place at the Wheatsheaf, Leighton Buzzard, England, on 21 December 2005. This was a 'secret' gig and not promoted beforehand; however, blackboards outside the pub announced "Kula Shaker tonight" on the night of the show. As a joke about the nature of secret gigs, Mills told the assembled crowd that the band was called The Garcons whilst wearing a "big hair" grey wig. All sources both official and unofficial have subsequently referred to this gig as a Kula Shaker show.

Kula Shaker announced on 11 January 2006 that they had reformed permanently. They released the following statement on their new official website (which launched that day):

During preparation for their comeback live dates, a new member joined the band – Harry Broadbent. He became the band's new keyboard player, and Kula Shaker were restored to a four-piece once more.

The band undertook a small UK tour in the Spring. The tour dates were split into two 'legs', with a pre-tour warm-up show in Milton Keynes. The band played to sell out audiences in smaller venues, playing a mix of new and old material. They also recorded a session for Scottish radio station Clyde1, and made an appearance on the Billy Sloan show on that station to coincide with this.

The band released a four-song EP entitled "Revenge of the King" on iTunes in April. This was later released on a limited run of 1000 10" vinyls, sold on certain dates of the band's April/May tour and later from the band's official website. Later still, the EP was released on CD in Japan with a bonus track (the 2006 radio session version of Govinda). Apart from the Japanese bonus track, the tracks on the EP were recorded in a very small studio in London right at the beginning of 2006, before Broadbent joined the band.

The band went on to play some festivals in the Summer of 2006 – T in the Park, Fuji Rock, V Festival and Pentaport Festival in Korea – along with a handful of warm-up dates. After this, they played one more live date in 2006, headlining the Purple Weekend festival in Spain at the end of the year.

After the summer festival dates, it was announced on the band's website that the third Kula Shaker album was underway. Pre-production started in September 2006, with final mixing completed by April 2007. It was produced in collaboration with an all-star team of hit makers & Grammy winners, including Tchad Blake (Peter Gabriel, Crowded House), Sam Williams (Supergrass) and Chris Sheldon (The Foo Fighters, The Pixies).

In Japan, the Freedom Lovin' People EP preceded the album. It was released there on 23 May 2007. The lead track from this release was the album track "Great Dictator (of the Free World)" and a rough animatic-style video was used to promote the song on Japanese music stations. In the UK, the first single from the album was "Second Sight" released on 13 August 2007, reaching No. 101 on the UK Singles Chart. The single was promoted with a pro-shot video featuring the band as characters from the Sherlock Holmes stories.

The third album, Strangefolk (which was the working title of second album, Peasants, Pigs & Astronauts), was released in Japan on 27 June 2007 through Sony, in Europe on 20 August 2007 through the band's own label, and on 19 February 2008 in North America through Cooking Vinyl. All editions contain at least one bonus track; the Japanese edition contains two further bonus tracks. The track "Song of Love/Narayana" on the album incorporates elements from the tracks "Narayan" and "Climbatize", both of which can be found on The Prodigy's The Fat of the Land. Narayan was co-written by Mills and included a vocal performance by him. The album reached No. 32 in Japan and No. 69 in the UK.

To capitalise on publicity surrounding the band's comeback, the re-release record label Music Club issued a hastily compiled double album Tattva : The Very Best Of Kula Shaker on 16 July 2007, which included all the tracks from the band's first two albums and a handful of previously released non-album tracks. The band had no input into any aspect of the release and their consent was not obtained for its release. They have been asking their fans not to buy it.

The band played UK warm-up dates from early June. They went on to play five festival dates in the summer – Bilbao BBK Live, Culura Quente festival, Japanese festival Fuji Rock, Norway's PulpIt Rock Festival and the iTunes Festival in London, along with two one-off dates – one in London and one in Spain. Further UK dates and a European tour followed in the Autumn. The band then rounded off the tour commitments for the year with two final performances in November, one at Leicester University and another at The Netherlands' Crossing Borders festival.

A live EP featuring four tracks from the band's performance at the iTunes festival was released through the iTunes Stores in various countries in October. A second single from Strangefolk, "Out on the Highway" was released on 5 November 2007, also only available as a download from the UK iTunes Store. Neither release achieved a placing on the UK chart. The final release of the year came on 14 December – the free download track "Drink Tea (for the Love Of God)" featured Alonza on vocals and a pro-tea drinking message in the lyrics. The track was accompanied by an animated video, released online on the same day, which was produced by animation house Model Robot.

The band played a Japanese tour and further tours of both the UK and mainland Europe at the start of 2008. They went on to play three European festival dates in the summer.

Pilgrims Progress (2008–2016)

On 2 July 2008 the band announced they were back in the studio working on their fourth studio album with working title Pilgrims Progress. However soon after the band became locked in a legal dispute with their label which resulted in most of the work for the next album being frozen. In May 2009, work on the new album had recommenced.

The band played some further live dates in 2009, starting with a pair of dates in Russia in February and following that up with two headline festival appearances in the summer, at Ypsigrock in Italy and Solfest in the UK. In September the band played a set as part of a fundraising evening to support the charity Anno's Africa.

On 20 January 2010, the band re-released their second album Peasants, Pigs and Astronauts on their own label with additional bonus tracks, interviews and artwork. Only 3000 copies were pressed and it was only available through their official website.

On 28 June 2010, the band's fourth album Pilgrims Progress was released. The lead single from the album was "Peter Pan R.I.P", which was released as a free download from the band's official website on 22 April 2010. The album was issued as a standard twelve track CD, as a limited edition deluxe box set, and as a super deluxe box set with a limited production run of 300 copies. Despite making a limited impact commercially the album was applauded by the music press, becoming their best reviewed album since their debut. The band played an album release show on 8 July at the Garage in London. A successful tour of the Far East followed with a number of festival dates across Japan, Taiwan, Indonesia, Malaysia, Korea and Hong Kong.

On 6 September 2010 Crispian Mills announced on the band's official website that the band were postponing touring so he could concentrate on a film project to begin in early 2011. The news was received with mixed reaction, many suggesting that the band have missed a great opportunity to gain considerable exposure on the back of the positive reaction towards Pilgrims Progress.

On 12 November 2010, the band announced they would be recording a Christmas single which would be a double A-side. The single, "Christmas Time (Is Here Again)/Snowflake" was released exclusively as a free download from the band's website on 10 December.

On 16 September 2011, the band released a 2 CD + 1 DVD 15th anniversary edition of K, including some unreleased material and a new documentary.

On 28 September 2015 the band announced they are returning in 2016 with a European tour and new album titled K 2.0, releasing two teasers of a track named "Mountain Lifter" then a song called "Infinite Sun". K 2.0 was officially released on digital, LP and CD formats on 12 February 2016.K was re-released by Columbia/BMG in 2016 to mark the 20th anniversary.

1st Congregational Church of Eternal Love and Free Hugs (2021–present)

In late 2021, the band announced on their Facebook page that they had completed their sixth album, which would be a double album consisting of 17 songs due for release in 2022. On 20 December 2021, the band released the Kula Christmas Wrap Up digitally, featuring two cover versions: "Snowflake" by Bucky and "Christmas Time (Is Here Again) by the Beatles. 

The band's sixth album, 1st Congregational Church of Eternal Love and Free Hugs, was released on 10 June 2022 and was preceded by the single "The Once and Future King". A further single, "Cherry Plum Tree (Farewell Beautiful Dreamer)" was released on 29 July 2022, and on 4th November 2022 they released "Gimme Some Truth", a John Lennon cover.

On 7th December 2022, Kula Shaker tweeted that original keyboardist Jay Darlington is back, and will be playing with them on tour.

 Musical style and media response 
Although Kula Shaker's sound owes a lot to the classic rock bands of 1960s and 1970s, the songs often combine Eastern-influenced sonics ("Govinda") with lyrical themes of a universal spirituality quest, employing ideas of soul and devotion from diverse traditions such as Hinduism ("Tattva"), to Christianity ("Great Hosannah") and even Native American Indian ("Infinite Sun").

Noel Gallagher was an early champion of the band, inviting them to support at Oasis' historic Knebworth concerts, but from the outset of their career, Kula Shaker polarised UK media opinion. This arguably stemmed from age-old British preconceptions about class and race. Not only were they white youngsters singing about Krishna in Sanskrit, they were seen as coming from privileged middle class backgrounds. Speaking in an interview in 2016, Mills says "When I was in private schools, they called me 'common', and when I was in state schools they called me 'posh'. It made me very cynical about all these labels." At the height of Britpop and 'lad culture', music publications like Melody Maker, Select, and NME often focused on the class angle and ridiculed the band's fascination with Indian culture. Mills commented in 2016, "The musical styles on K are mainstream now. [In 1996] people didn't know how to understand it or where to place it, so all that was left to do was deride it."

Members

 Members 
Crispian Mills – lead vocals, guitars, tamboura, harmonica 
Alonza Bevan – bass, additional guitars, piano, vocals 
Paul Winterhart – drums, percussion 
Jay Darlington – keyboards, piano, organ, mellotron 
Former member
Harry Broadbent – keyboards, piano, organ, backing vocals 

 Timeline 

 Discography K (1996)Peasants, Pigs & Astronauts (1999)Strangefolk (2007)Pilgrims Progress (2010)K 2.0 (2016)1st Congregational Church of Eternal Love and Free Hugs'' (2022)

References

External links
 Official website

English rock music groups
Britpop groups
Brit Award winners